Jetmir Krasniqi (born 1 January 1995) is a professional footballer who plays as a defender for Swiss club Schaffhausen and the Kosovo national team. He previously played for Switzerland national under-21 football team.

Early life
Krasniqi was born in Nyon, Switzerland from Kosovo Albanian parents.

Club career

Lugano
On 15 January 2018. Krasniqi signed Swiss Super League side Lugano. On 10 February 2018, he made his debut in a 1–0 home win against Sion after coming on as a substitute at 86th minute in place of Domen Črnigoj.

International career

Switzerland

Under-20
On 4 September 2014. Krasniqi made his debut with Switzerland U20 in a 2014–15 Under-20 Four Nations Tournament match against Poland U20 after coming on as a substitute at 62nd minute in place of Admir Seferagić.

Under-21
On 18 November 2014. Krasniqi made his debut with Switzerland U21 in a friendly match against Scotland U21 after coming on as a substitute at 74th minute in place of Saidy Janko.

Kosovo
On 23 May 2018. Krasniqi received a call-up from Kosovo for a friendly match against Albania and made his debut after coming on as a substitute at 68th minute in place of Mërgim Vojvoda.

Career statistics

Club

References

External links

1995 births
Living people
Kosovo Albanians
People from Nyon
People from Klina
Kosovan footballers
Kosovo international footballers
Swiss men's footballers
Switzerland youth international footballers
Switzerland under-21 international footballers
Swiss people of Kosovan descent
Swiss people of Albanian descent
Swiss Challenge League players
FC Lausanne-Sport players
FC Le Mont players
FC Chiasso players
Swiss Super League players
FC Lugano players
Liga I players
FC Voluntari players
FC Schaffhausen players
Association football defenders
Kosovan expatriate footballers
Kosovan expatriate sportspeople in Romania
Expatriate footballers in Romania
Sportspeople from Peja
Sportspeople from the canton of Vaud